John Fairfield Dryden (August 7, 1839 – November 24, 1911) was the founder of the Prudential Insurance Company and a United States senator from New Jersey. He was known as the "father of industrial insurance".

Early life 
Dryden was born in Temple, Maine on August 7, 1839. He moved in 1846 with his parents to Worcester, Massachusetts.  He graduated from Worcester Academy and later attended Yale College.

Career
In 1875, he founded the Widows and Orphans Friendly Society (now Prudential Financial) in Newark, New Jersey, becoming its first secretary and in 1881 its president, serving in the latter position until his death in 1911. His son Forrest succeeded him as president, serving until 1922.

Dryden was one of the founders of the Fidelity Trust Company and was involved in the establishment and management of various street railways, banks, and other financial enterprises in New Jersey, New York, and Pennsylvania.

Political career
He was elected as a Republican to the U.S. Senate to fill the vacancy caused by the death of William J. Sewell, serving from January 29, 1902, to March 3, 1907. Dryden was a candidate for reelection but withdrew because of a deadlock in the state legislature, which at the time elected U.S. Senators. While in the Senate, he was chairman of the Committee on Relations with Canada (57th Congress) and a member of the Committee on Enrolled Bills (58th and 59th Congresses).

Personal life
Dryden was married to Cynthia Jennings Fairchild (1842–1916). Together, they were the parents of:

 Forrest Fairchild Dryden (1864–1932), who married Grace Marion Carleton (1865–1936).
 Susan Fairchild "Susie" Dryden (1870–1932), who married prominent businessman and philanthropist Anthony R. Kuser.

Dryden died in Newark, New Jersey on November 24, 1911 from pneumonia, following removal of gall stones two weeks earlier. After a funeral at the Third Presbyterian Church in Newark, he was buried at Mount Pleasant Cemetery there.

Legacy
His estate was valued at $50,000,000. In addition to his home in Bernardsville, New Jersey, Dryden was in the process of constructing a home in High Point, New Jersey that was to be one of the largest homes in the country.

His daughter Susan used part of the Prudential fortune to donate  for a state park at New Jersey's highest point. John Dryden Kuser, Dryden's grandson, was a state senator and Brooke Astor's first husband.

References

External links

 
 

1839 births
1911 deaths
Worcester Academy alumni
Burials at Mount Pleasant Cemetery (Newark, New Jersey)
People from Bernardsville, New Jersey
Politicians from Newark, New Jersey
Politicians from Worcester, Massachusetts
Prudential Financial people
Republican Party United States senators from New Jersey
New Jersey Republicans
Deaths from pneumonia in New Jersey
Businesspeople from Worcester, Massachusetts
19th-century American politicians
Businesspeople from Newark, New Jersey
People from Temple, Maine
Yale College alumni
19th-century American businesspeople
19th-century American philanthropists